The 2015 Donegal Senior Football Championship was being contested by senior Gaelic football clubs under the auspices of Donegal GAA. The defending champions were St Eunan's.

Format

The 2015 County Championship took the same format as the 2014 championship in which there was four groups of four with the top two qualifying for the quarter-finals. Bottom of each group play in relegation play-offs to decide which team is relegated the 2016 intermediate championship.

Group stage

Group 1

Round 1
 Gaoth Dobhair 1-8, 1-10 Glenswilly, Gweedore, 23/5/2015,
 Malin 1-13, 0-16 Seán MacCumhaills, Connolly Park, 24/5/2015,

Round 2
 Seán MacCumhaills 2-8, 1-15 Gaoth Dobhair, MacCumhaill Park, 22/8/2015
 Glenswilly 3-9, 1-8 Malin, Glenswilly, 23/8/2015

Round 3
 Gaoth Dobhair 1-11, 3-9 Malin, Gweedore, 30/8/2015
 Glenswilly 1-14, 2-7 Seán MacCumhaills, Glenswilly, 30/8/2015

Group 2 

Round 1'
 Ardara 0-7, 2-10 St Eunan's, Ardara, 24/5/2015,
 Naomh Conaill 2-14, 1-8 An Clochán Liath, Glenties, 24/5/2015,

Round 2
 St Eunan's 0-7, 2-12 Naomh Conaill, O'Donnell Park, 4/10/2015,
 An Clochán Liath 2-7, 0-12 Ardara, An Clochán Liath, 4/10/2015,

Round 3
 St Eunan's 0-14, 1-6 An Clochán Liath, O'Donnell Park, 29/8/2015,
 Ardara 1-9, 2-13 Naomh Conaill, Ardara, 30/8/2015,

Group 3 

Round 1
 Glenfin 2-9, 3-9 Four Masters, Glennfin, 23/5/2015,
 St Michael's 2-11, 0-7 Cloich Cheann Fhaola, Dunfanaghy, 24/5/2015,

Round 2
 Four Masters 2-5, 3-12 St Michael's, Pairc Tir Chonaill, 23/8/2015,
 Cloich Cheann Fhaola 1-11, 1-12 Glenfin, Cloughaneely, 24/8/2015,

Round 3
 Glenfin 1-8, 2-7 St Michael's, Glenfin, 30/8/2015,
 Four Masters 2-13, 1-10 Cloich Cheann Fhaola, 20/8/2015,

Group 4 

Round 1
 Kilcar 2-13, 0-8 Naomh Muire, Kilcar, 23/5/2015,
 Termon 1-11, 0-12 Killybegs, Termon, 23/5/2015,

Round 2
 Killybegs 2-4, 1-14 Kilcar, Killybegs, 22/8/2015,
 Naomh Muire 0-15, 1-12 Termon, The Banks, 22/8/2015,

Round 3
 Kilcar 3-12, 1-8 Termon, Kilcar, 30/8/2015,
 Naomh Muire 0-14, 2-5 Killybegs, The Banks, 30/8/2015,

Knockout stage

Relegation playoff

Relegation Semi-final
 Ardara 0-13, 2-7 Cloich Cheann Fhaola, Glenswilly, 12/9/2015,
 Seán MacCumhaills 3-12, 1-16 Killybegs, Tir Conaill Park, 26/9/2015,
 Ardara 3-9, 0-6 Cloich Cheann Fhaola, Dungloe, 26/9/2015,

Relegation final
 Killybegs 3-12, 0-11 Cloich Cheann Fhaola, The Banks, 3/10/2015,

Finals

Quarter-finals
 Naomh Conaill 0-11, 1-5 Termon, MacCumhaill Park, 12/9/2016,
 Kilcar 3-13, 0-8 Four Masters, Killybegs, 12/9/2015,
 St Michael's 3-15, 1-5 Malin, O'Donnell Park, 13/9/2015,
 St Eunan's 3-7, 0-8 Glenswilly, MacCumhaill Park, 13/9/2016,

Semi-finals
 St Eunan's 2-15, 0-11 St Michael's, MacCumhaill Park, 26/9/2016,
 Naomh Conaill 4-10, 0-10 Kilcar, MacCumhaill Park, 27/9/2016,

Final
 Naomh Conaill 0-11, 0-10 St Eunan's, MacCumhaill Park, 18/10/2016,

References

Donegal Senior Football Championship
Donegal Senior Football Championship